Steven Lang (born 3 September 1987) is a Swiss former footballer who played as a forward or left midfielder.

External links
 Career history at ASF
 
 

1987 births
Living people
Swiss men's footballers
Switzerland youth international footballers
Neuchâtel Xamax FCS players
FC Aarau players
Grasshopper Club Zürich players
FC Lausanne-Sport players
Servette FC players
FC Vaduz players
Swiss expatriate footballers
Swiss expatriate sportspeople in Liechtenstein
Expatriate footballers in Liechtenstein
FC St. Gallen players
FC Schaffhausen players
Swiss Super League players
Swiss Challenge League players
People from Delémont
Association football midfielders
Sportspeople from the canton of Jura